Abbot Hall may refer to:

 Abbot Hall Art Gallery, Kendal, Cumbria, England
 Abbot Hall (Marblehead, Massachusetts), United States
 Abbot Hall (Phillips Exeter Academy), Exeter, New Hampshire, United States

Architectural disambiguation pages